National Tap Dance Day falls on May 25 every year, and is a celebration of tap dance as an American art form. The idea of National Tap Dance Day was first presented to U.S. Congress on February 7, 1989, and was signed into US American Law by President George H. W. Bush, on November 8, 1989. The one-time official observance was on May 25, 1989. Tap Dance Day is also celebrated in other countries, particularly Japan, Australia, India and Iceland.

Tap Dance Day is celebrated online, with 27,518,521 mentions on social media in 2016.

Some may also celebrate it individually, due to geographical dispersion, or lack of access to the wider tap community. National Tap Dance Day is celebrated in many different ways. For example, a studio may send people out onto the streets to teach the Shim Sham Shimmy to passers by. The Shim Sham Shimmy is a popular move that is used in tap dancing. However, there are several cities (particularly in the United States) that have their own performances and events to coincide with Tap Dance Day.

References

External links 
Learn about National Tap Day Japan, celebrating its 40th anniversary in 2004.
National Tap Dance Day mentions on social media.

Tap dance
May observances
101st United States Congress